Pilophorus is a genus of plant bug. It is the type genus for the Pilophorini tribe.

Species

Notes

References
 Encyclopedia of Life entry
 

Miridae genera